The Douglas MacArthur Monument at the United States Military Academy at West Point commemorates the Medal of Honor-winning former Superintendent and General of the Army Douglas MacArthur.  Designed by Walker Hancock, it was dedicated by MacArthur's widow Jean MacArthur in 1969.  Situated on the upper western corner of the Plain next to the north entrance to MacArthur Barracks, the monument consists of a statue of the general surrounded by angled granite walls that bear inscribed excerpts from his final public speech, the 1962 Duty, Honor, Country address he made to the Corps of Cadets upon receiving the Thayer Award.

References

Monuments and memorials at West Point
1969 sculptures
Bronze sculptures in New York (state)
Statues in New York (state)
Monuments and memorials to Douglas MacArthur